Bayport Aerodrome  (formerly known as Davis Field and then from 1953-1977 as Edwards Airport) is a historic, rural airport one mile northwest of Bayport, Long Island, New York, United States. The airport has a grass runway and is owned and operated by the Town of Islip. It is home to a non-profit organization that specializes in antique airplanes, known as the Bayport Aerodrome Society, which was established in 1972.

Bayport Aerodrome is not used for commercial aviation, such as the nearby Long Island MacArthur Airport. The airport has been listed on the National Register of Historic Places as a national historic district since January 22, 2008.

References

External links
Bayport Aerodrome Society (Official site)
 New York State DOT Airport Diagram
Resources for this airport:
AirNav airport information for 23N
FlightAware airport information and live flight tracker
SkyVector aeronautical chart for 23N

Islip (town), New York
Transportation buildings and structures on the National Register of Historic Places in New York (state)
Aerospace museums in New York (state)
Museums in Suffolk County, New York
Historic districts on the National Register of Historic Places in New York (state)
National Register of Historic Places in Suffolk County, New York
Airports on the National Register of Historic Places
Airports in Suffolk County, New York
Airports for antique aircraft